The Natural Law Party of Quebec ran thirty-five candidates in the 1998 Quebec provincial election, none of whom were elected. Information about these candidates may be found on this page.

Candidates

Berthier: Louise Roy
Louise Roy received 268 votes (0.72%), finishing fifth against Parti Québécois incumbent Gilles Baril. She is not to be confused with a better known Montreal administrator of the same name.

Brome—Missisquoi: Jean-Charles Rouleau
Jean-Charles Rouleau became active with the transcendental meditation movement in 1984 and identifies as an Ayurvedic scholar. He received 194 votes (0.61%), finishing fourth against Liberal Party incumbent Pierre Paradis.

Louis-Hébert: Jean Cerigo
Jean Cerigo was a Natural Law Party candidate in one federal and two provincial elections. He has lectured on transcendental meditation. In 2003, he led a group of the Maharishi Mahesh Yogi's Montreal followers in a bid to construct a twelve-thousand square-foot "peace palace" on the West Island.

Mercier: Pierre Bergeron
Pierre Bergeron was a Natural Law candidate in one federal and two provincial elections. He described himself as a professor in 1993.

References

Candidates in Quebec provincial elections